The Pascha is a 12-storey 9,000 square metre brothel in Cologne, Germany. With about 120 prostitutes, over 80 supporting-role employees and up to 1,000 customers per day, it is the largest brothel in the world.

History
The brothel was opened in January 1972 in the Hornstraße, under the name "Eros Center". It was Europe's first high-rise brothel. The city of Cologne wanted to eliminate the red light district "Kleine Brinkgasse" in the city centre and issued a licence to build the new brothel on land owned by the city in the outskirts of town. The prostitutes sued against closure of the Kleine Brinkgasse area and ultimately lost. In 1995 the owner of the Eros Centre changed after foreclosure, and the new name "Pascha" was introduced. They later added houses under the same name in Salzburg, Munich and Linz.

Operation
The house rents 126 rooms on 7 floors to prostitutes for a fee of 180 Euro per day, which includes meals, medical care, and the 20 Euro of tax that authorities collect per prostitute per day (including Cologne's "pleasure tax" of 6 Euro). The women come from many countries; about 30% of them are German. They typically sit outside of their rooms and negotiate with customers who wander the hallways. Some of the women live in their rooms, others rent a second room to stay in, while still others stay in their own apartments in Cologne.

The house is open 24 hours a day; customers of the prostitutes pay an entrance fee of 5 Euro and then negotiate directly with the women, who work independently and keep all of the money. One floor is reserved for low-cost service and another one for transgender prostitutes. The house also contains a regular hotel, a table dance nightclub with separate entrance, several bars, and a separate club-style brothel on the top floor.

In 2003, oral sex and intercourse cost about 50 Euro. The brothel advertises a money-back guarantee in the case of unsatisfactory service.

Incidents
In June 2003 a Thai prostitute was stabbed to death by a customer in the Pascha; she managed to press the alarm button in her room and security personnel caught the murderer. In January 2006, another prostitute was attacked by a customer with a knife. The woman working next-door alerted security and the perpetrator was caught; the victim survived.

After a police raid of the brothel in April 2005, it was reported that a gun and some cocaine was found and 23 people were arrested, most of them because of suspected violation of immigration laws. Further it was reported that four of the prostitutes were between 14 and 15 years old. The brothel was not fined however, since the girls, who were from Africa, looked older and carried fake documents showing an older age.

It was reported that, in August 2005, two women, 19 and 29 years old, had rented two rooms in the Pascha and announced over the internet that they would pay any man 50 Euro for sex; the goal was to find out who could have more partners in one day. In the end they had sex for 11 hours with a total of 115 men, and about 1,700 others had to be turned away. The German tabloid Bild turned the story into a headline the next day. The women insisted that they had paid the men from their own vacation money and had not received any compensation from Bild or Pascha. The 19-year-old woman later worked in the club brothel of Pascha.

Before the 2006 FIFA World Cup in Germany, Muslims protested that the brothel insulted Islam when it advertised using a 24-metre-high by 8-metre-wide poster, mounted on the side of its building, showing a half-naked woman and the flags from all of the countries which qualified for the world cup, including those of Muslim nations. The slogan on the poster read Die Welt zu Gast bei Freundinnen (The world as guest with girlfriends), a pun on the slogan for that year's World Cup, Die Welt zu Gast bei Freunden (The world as guest with friends).  The protesters compared the poster to the Jyllands-Posten Muhammad cartoons. In response to the protests, and threats of violence, which began on 21 April 2006, the owners blacked out the flags of Saudi Arabia and Iran (both of which include words from the Quran), though the flag of Tunisia (which does not show any scriptural text) was left alone.

In March 2007, the Pascha announced that senior citizens above the age of 66 would receive a discount during afternoons; half of the price of 50 Euro for a "normal session" would be covered by the house.

In September 2007, a Turkish customer tried to set fire to the Pascha by igniting gasoline in the entrance area; he also carried a number of Molotov cocktails. He had earlier had a conflict with a prostitute and security personnel and returned with 10 accomplices. He received a suspended sentence of two years in prison.

In 2008, Pascha offered free entrance for life to the brothel and the night club to men who agreed to have Pascha's logo tattooed on their arm; about forty men took them up on the offer.

In December 2008, three of Pascha's bouncers beat up an Albanian man who supposedly had ignored an order to stay away from the house and who might have been involved in the bouncer scene. The three men received fines and suspended sentences of 18 months for aggravated assault.

In December 2009, American rapper 50 Cent gave a concert in Pascha's night club.

On Mother's Day 2011, the brothel organised a tour for women; female guests are normally not admitted to the establishment.

Pascha's founder, Hermann Müller, was sentenced to 3 years in prison on 4 September 2017. This was for tax evasion in one of his brothels in Munich.

The brothel was raided on 5 September 2017 by about 250 police officers. Prosecutor Rene Seppi refused to give details about the raid, but said it was in connection with "serious charges".

Closure during COVID 2020-2022
The Pascha filed for bankruptcy in early September 2020. Prostitution was outlawed in the state of North Rhine-Westphalia from the beginning of the COVID-19 outbreak, which led to authorities repeatedly renewing fortnightly closure orders. This, according to owner Armin Lobscheid, made it impossible to continue the business or make financial plans. 

After a renovation, Pascha reopened on March 18, 2022 under a new owner.

Documentary
Like a Pascha (2010) (Swedish: Som en Pascha) is a documentary by Svante Tidholm looking at the crisis of masculinity from a feminist point of view. It was filmed at Pascha over the course of three years. The film features interviews with the manager, an employee, a prostitute, a customer and some footage of a rooftop orgy at the brothel. Tidholm remained critical of the business.

See also
Prostitution in Germany

References

External links
Official web site
Press and TV reports
Interview with Pascha's hair dresser 
Interview with Pascha's manager 

Brothels in Germany
Entertainment companies established in 1972
Companies based in Cologne
1972 establishments in West Germany